One Little Indian is a 1973 American Western comedy film produced by Walt Disney Productions starring James Garner and Vera Miles. The supporting cast includes Pat Hingle, John Doucette, Morgan Woodward, Andrew Prine, as well as a 10-year-old Jodie Foster. The plotline involves a cavalry soldier's misadventures with a camel and a little boy. The film was written by Harry Spalding and directed by Bernard McEveety.

Garner later wrote that "I've done some things I'm not proud of. This is one of them. The only bright spot was a ten year old Jodie Foster."

Cast

Production
Parts of the film were shot in Kanab Canyon, the Gap, Kanab movie fort, and the Coral Pink Sand Dunes in Utah.

Reception
The film earned an estimated $2 million in North American rentals.

References

External links 

 
 
 
 
 James Garner Interview on the Charlie Rose Show
 James Garner interview at Archive of American Television

1973 films
1973 Western (genre) films
1973 comedy films
1970s Western (genre) comedy films
American Western (genre) comedy films
1970s English-language films
Films about camels
Films directed by Bernard McEveety Jr.
Films scored by Jerry Goldsmith
Films shot in Utah
Walt Disney Pictures films
Western (genre) cavalry films
Films produced by Winston Hibler
1970s American films